This article is about the particular significance of the year 1881 to Wales and its people.

Incumbents

Archdruid of the National Eisteddfod of Wales – Clwydfardd

Lord Lieutenant of Anglesey – William Owen Stanley 
Lord Lieutenant of Brecknockshire – Joseph Bailey, 1st Baron Glanusk
Lord Lieutenant of Caernarvonshire – Edward Douglas-Pennant, 1st Baron Penrhyn 
Lord Lieutenant of Cardiganshire – Edward Pryse
Lord Lieutenant of Carmarthenshire – John Campbell, 2nd Earl Cawdor 
Lord Lieutenant of Denbighshire – William Cornwallis-West  
Lord Lieutenant of Flintshire – Hugh Robert Hughes
Lord Lieutenant of Glamorgan – Christopher Rice Mansel Talbot 
Lord Lieutenant of Merionethshire – Edward Lloyd-Mostyn, 2nd Baron Mostyn
Lord Lieutenant of Monmouthshire – Henry Somerset, 8th Duke of Beaufort
Lord Lieutenant of Montgomeryshire – Edward Herbert, 3rd Earl of Powis
Lord Lieutenant of Pembrokeshire – William Edwardes, 4th Baron Kensington
Lord Lieutenant of Radnorshire – Arthur Walsh, 2nd Baron Ormathwaite 

Bishop of Bangor – James Colquhoun Campbell
Bishop of Llandaff – Alfred Ollivant 
Bishop of St Asaph – Joshua Hughes 
Bishop of St Davids – Basil Jones

Events
January – At least five people freeze to death during blizzards and extreme low temperatures throughout Wales.
4 March – Physician William Price marries 22-year-old Gwenllian Llywelyn in a Druidic ceremony at Pontypridd on his 81st birthday.
27 August – The Sunday Closing (Wales) Act prohibits the sale of alcohol on a Sunday. This is the first Act of Parliament in the United Kingdom since the 1542 Act of Union whose application is restricted to Wales.
13 October – 19 people drown when the Cyprian is wrecked off the Lleyn peninsula.
date unknown
Welsh Regiment formed as part of the Childers Reforms of the British Army, incorporating the 41st (Welsh) Regiment of Foot.
River Vyrnwy is dammed to create Lake Vyrnwy.

Arts and literature
The Cambrian Academy of Art is formed by English and Welsh artists in North Wales.

Awards
National Eisteddfod of Wales  – held at Merthyr Tydfil
Chair – Evan Rees ("Dyfed"), "Cariad"
Crown – Watkin Hezekiah Williams

New books
Amy Dillwyn – Chloe Arguelle
Daniel Owen – Y Dreflan

Music

Sport
Rugby union
19 February – First Wales national game, played at Blackheath against England. Wales lose heavily.
12 March – The Welsh Rugby Union is formed as the Welsh Football Union in a meeting in Neath.

Births
1 January – George Latham, footballer (died 1939)
3 January – Lewis Pugh Evans, VC recipient (died 1962)
14 February – William John Gruffydd, academic and politician (died 1954)
9 April – John Hart Evans, Wales international rugby player (died 1959)
15 April – David Thomas ("Afan"), composer (died 1928)
16 April – Ifor Williams, academic (died 1965)
5 May – Rupert Price Hallowes, VC recipient (died 1915)
16 June – David Grenfell, politician (died 1968)
20 June – John Crichton-Stuart, 4th Marquess of Bute, landowner (died 1947)
August – John Lewis, footballer (died 1954)
30 September – Philip Lewis Griffiths, lawyer (died 1945)
1 October – Cliff Pritchard, Wales international rugby player (died 1954)
28 October – Edward Evans, 1st Baron Mountevans, explorer (died 1957)
10 December – David Phillips Jones, Wales international rugby player (died 1936)
December – George Hall, politician (died 1965)
date unknown
Robert Williams, trade union leader (died 1936)

Deaths
3 January – William H. C. Lloyd, clergyman, 78
19 January – John Roose Elias, poet, 60
11 March – Thomas Brigstocke, portrait painter, 71
20 April – William Burges, architect, 53
7 June – William Milbourne James, judge, 74
26 July – George Borrow, author of Wild Wales, 78
13 October – Edwin Barber Morgan, Welsh-descended president of Wells Fargo, 67
20 November – Hugh Owen, educationist, 77
22 November – John Owen Griffith (Ioan Arfon), poet and critic, 53
10 December – Walter Powell, industrialist and politician, 39

References

 
Wales